Timeline of the COVID-19 pandemic in Scotland may refer to:

Timeline of the COVID-19 pandemic in Scotland (2020)
Timeline of the COVID-19 pandemic in Scotland (2021)
Timeline of the COVID-19 pandemic in Scotland (2022)

Scotland